Zoltan Grad, also known as Zoltan Deak (May 24, 1904 in Budapest, Hungary – January 29, 2003 in the Bronx, New York) was the editor of Magyar Szó, a Hungarian-American weekly newspaper based in Manhattan, for 51 years.

Information
His tenure as editor of a news weekly for just over a half century is believed to be unprecedented in the United States. Grad was the author of numerous books, including Monopolies and How the Hungarians Saved Western Civilization. In 1984, he won Hungary's highest civilian honor, the Hungarian medal of Honor, for his work as a journalist and fighter for civil liberties, peace and justice. Hungarian scientist Albert Szent-Györgyi, who discovered vitamin C, was honored at the same ceremony, held at the Hungarian ambassador's residence in Manhattan. Grad's wife, Fay, still lives in the Bronx. The couple had two sons, Robert and Peter.

References

1904 births
2003 deaths
Hungarian emigrants to the United States
American male journalists
20th-century American journalists